Frigoriflavimonas is a Gram-negative, strictly aerobic and rod-shaped genus of bacteria from the family of Weeksellaceae with one known species, Frigoriflavimonas asaccharolytica.

References

Flavobacteria
Taxa described in 2022
Monotypic bacteria genera